The history of logic as a subject has been characterised by many disputes over what the topic deals with, and the main article 'Logic' has as a result been hesitant to commit to a particular definition of logic.  This article surveys various definitions of the subject that have appeared over the centuries through to modern times, and puts them in context as reflecting rival conceptions of the subject.

Rival conceptions of logic

In the period of scholastic philosophy, logic was predominantly Aristotelian.  Following the decline of scholasticism, logic was thought of as an affair of ideas by early modern philosophers such as Locke and Hume (1711-1716). Immanuel Kant took this one step further.  He begins with the assumption of the empiricist philosophers, that all knowledge whatsoever is internal to the mind, and that we have no genuine knowledge of 'things in themselves'.  Furthermore, (an idea he seemed to have got from Hume) the material of knowledge is a succession of separate ideas which have no intrinsic connection and thus no real unity.  In order that these disparate sensations be brought into some sort of order and coherence, there must be an internal mechanism in the mind which provides the forms by which we think, perceive and reason.

Kant calls these forms Categories (in a somewhat different sense than employed by the Aristotelian logicians), of which he claims there are twelve:

 Quantity (Singular, Particular, Universal)
 Quality (Affirmative, Negative, Infinite)
 Relation (Categorical, Hypothetical, Disjunctive)
 Modality (Problematic, Assertoric, Apodictic)

However, this seems to be an arbitrary arrangement, driven by the desire to present a harmonious appearance than from any underlying method or system.  For example, the triple nature of each division forced him to add artificial categories such as the infinite judgment.

This conception of logic eventually developed into an extreme form of psychologism espoused in the nineteenth by Benno Erdmann and others.  The view of historians of logic is that Kant's influence was negative.

Another view of logic espoused by Hegel and others of his school (such as Lotze, Bradley, Bosanquet and others), was the 'Logic of the Pure Idea'.  The central feature of this view is the identification of Logic and Metaphysics.  The Universe has its origin in the categories of thought.  Thought in its fullest development becomes the Absolute Idea, a divine mind evolving itself in the development of the Universe.

In the modern period, Gottlob Frege said "Just as 'beautiful' points the way for aesthetics and 'good' for ethics, so do words like 'true' for logic", and went on characterise the distinctive task of logic "to discern the laws of truth".
Later, W. V. Quine (1940, pp. 2–3) defined logic in terms of a logical vocabulary, which in turn is identified by an argument that the many particular vocabularies —Quine mentions geological vocabulary— are used in their particular discourses together with a common, topic-independent kernel of terms.  These terms, then, constitute the logical vocabulary, and the logical truths are those truths common to all particular topics.

Hofweber (2004) lists several definitions of logic, and goes on to claim that all definitions of logic are of one of four sorts.  These are that logic is the study of: (i) artificial formal structures, (ii) sound inference (e.g., Poinsot), (iii) tautologies (e.g., Watts), or (iv) general features of thought (e.g., Frege).  He argues then that these definitions are related to each other, but do not exhaust each other, and that an examination of formal ontology shows that these mismatches between rival definitions are due to tricky issues in ontology.

Informal and colloquial definitions 
Arranged in approximate chronological order.

 The tool for distinguishing between the true and the false (Averroes).
 The science of reasoning, teaching the way of investigating unknown truth in connection with a thesis (Robert Kilwardby).
 The art whose function is to direct the reason lest it err in the manner of inferring or knowing (John Poinsot).
 The art of conducting reason well in knowing things (Antoine Arnauld).
 The right use of reason in the inquiry after truth (Isaac Watts).
 The Science, as well as the Art, of reasoning (Richard Whately).
 The science of the operations of the understanding which are subservient to the estimation of evidence (John Stuart Mill).
 The science of the laws of discursive thought (James McCosh).
 The science of the most general laws of truth (Gottlob Frege).

See also 
 Universal logic

Notes

References 

 Beaney, M. (1997). The Frege Reader.  Oxford: Blackwell.
 Ferreirós, J. (2001). The Road to Modern Logic—An Interpretation.  In Bulletin of Symbolic Logic 7(4):441-483.
 Frege, G. (1897). Logic. transl. Long, P. & White, R., Posthumous Writings.
 Hofweber, T. (2004). Logic and ontology. Stanford Encyclopedia of Philosophy.
 Joyce, G.H. (1908). Principles of Logic. London.
 Kilwardby, R. The Nature of Logic, from De Ortu Scientarum, transl. Kretzmann, in Kretzmann N. & Stump E., The Cambridge Translation of Medieval Philosophical Texts,  Vol I.  Cambridge 1988, pp. 262 ff.)
 McCosh, J. (1870). The Laws of Discursive Thought. London.
 Mill, J.S. (1904). A System of Logic.  8th edition. London.
 Poinsot, J. (1637/1955). 'Outlines of Formal Logic'. In his Ars Logica, Lyons 1637, ed. and transl. F.C. Wade, 1955.
 Quine, W.V.O. (1940/1981). Mathematical Logic.  Third edition. Harvard University Press.
 Watts, I. (1725). Logick.
 Whateley, R.(1826). Elements of Logic.

Logic
Logic